Mount Sinai Hospital, founded in 1852, is one of the oldest and largest teaching hospitals in the United States. It is located in East Harlem in the New York City borough of Manhattan, on the eastern border of Central Park stretching along Madison and Fifth Avenues, between East 98th Street and East 103rd Street. The entire Mount Sinai health system has over 7,400 physicians, as well as 3,815 beds, and delivers over 16,000 babies a year. In 2023, the hospital was ranked 23rd among over 2,300 hospitals in the world and the best hospital in New York state by Newsweek. Adjacent to the hospital is the Mount Sinai Kravis Children's Hospital which provides comprehensive pediatric specialties and subspecialties to infants, children, teens, and young adults aged 0–21 throughout the region.

History

At the time of the founding of the hospital in 1852, other hospitals in New York City discriminated against Jewish people both by not hiring them to treat patients, and by prohibiting them from being treated in the hospitals' wards. Orthodox Jewish philanthropist Sampson Simson (1780–1857) founded the hospital to address the needs of New York City's rapidly growing Jewish immigrant community. It was the second Jewish hospital in the United States, after the Jewish Hospital, located in Cincinnati, Ohio, which was established in 1847.

, as it was called until adopting its current name in 1866, was built on West 28th Street in Manhattan, between Seventh and Eighth Avenues, on land donated by Simson. It opened two years before Simson's death. Four years later, it was unexpectedly filled to capacity with soldiers injured in the American Civil War.

The Jews' Hospital felt the effects of the escalating Civil War in other ways, as staff doctors and board members were called into service. Dr. Israel Moses served four years as lieutenant colonel in the 72nd New York Infantry Regiment; Joseph Seligman had to resign as a member of the board of directors, as he was increasingly called upon by President Lincoln for advice on the country's growing financial crisis.

The New York Draft Riots of 1863 also strained the hospital's resources, as it struggled to tend to the many wounded.

More and more, the Jews' Hospital was finding itself an integral part of the general community. In 1866, to reflect this new-found role, it changed its name. In 1872, the hospital moved uptown to the east side of Lexington Avenue, between East 66th and East 67th Streets.

20th century

Now called Mount Sinai Hospital, the institution forged relationships with many physicians who made contributions to medicine, including Henry N. Heineman, Frederick S. Mandelbaum, Bernard Sachs, Charles A. Elsberg, Emanuel Libman, and, most significantly, Abraham Jacobi, known as the father of American pediatrics and a champion of construction at the hospital's new site on Manhattan's Upper East Side in 1904.

The hospital established a school of nursing in 1881. Created by Alma deLeon Hendricks and a small group of women, Mount Sinai Hospital Training School for Nurses was taken over by the hospital in 1895. In 1923, its name was changed to Mount Sinai Hospital School of Nursing. This school closed in 1971 after graduating 4,700 nurses—all women, except one man in the last class. An active alumnae association continues.

The early 20th century saw the population of New York City explode. That, coupled with many new discoveries at Mount Sinai (including significant advances in blood transfusions and the first endotracheal anesthesia apparatus), meant that Mount Sinai's pool of doctors and experts was in increasing demand. A $1.35 million ($ in current dollar terms) expansion of the 1904 hospital site raced to keep pace with demand. The opening of the new buildings was delayed by the advent of World War I. Mount Sinai responded to a request from the United States Army Medical Corps with the creation of Base Hospital No.3. This unit went to France in early 1918, and treated 9,127 patients with 172 deaths: 54 surgical and 118 medical, the latter due mainly to influenza and pneumonia.

World War II
Two decades later, with tensions in Europe escalating, a committee dedicated to finding placements for doctors fleeing Nazi Germany was founded in 1933. With the help of the National Committee for the Resettlement of Foreign Physicians, Mount Sinai Hospital became a new home for a large number of émigrés. When World War II broke out, Mount Sinai was the first hospital to throw open its doors to Red Cross nurses' aides; the hospital trained many in its effort to reduce the nursing shortage in the States. Meanwhile, the president of the medical board, George Baehr, M.D., was called by President Roosevelt to serve as the nation's chief medical director of the Office of Civilian Defense.

These wartime roles were eclipsed, however, when the men and women of Mount Sinai's 3rd General Hospital set sail for Casablanca, Morocco, eventually setting up a 1,000-bed hospital in war-torn Tunisia. Before moving to tend to the needs of soldiers in Italy and France, the 3rd General Hospital had treated more than 5,000 wounded soldiers.

Postwar

In 1963, the hospital created a medical school, and in 1968, it welcomed the first students of the Mount Sinai School of Medicine, now the Icahn School of Medicine at Mount Sinai. The 1980s had a $500 million hospital expansion, including the construction of the Guggenheim Pavilion, the first medical facility designed by I.M. Pei. Its faculty has made significant contributions to gene therapy, cardiology, immunotherapy, organ transplants, cancer treatments, and minimally invasive surgery.

Among the innovations at Mount Sinai were performing the first blood transplant into the vein of a fetus in 1986, and the development of a technique for inserting radioactive seeds into the prostate to treat cancer in 1995.

21st century

At Mount Sinai the staff performed the first successful composite tracheal transplant, which was performed at the hospital in 2005.

Dr. Jack M. Gorman, formerly Department Chairman of Psychiatry at Mount Sinai, engaged in a long-term inappropriate sexual relationship with a patient prior to October 2005.

In January 2013 David L. Reich was the first openly gay medical doctor named interim president of Mount Sinai Hospital as reported by The New York Times. In October of the same year he was named president.

In August 2016 Dennis S. Charney, the dean of the medical school, was shot and wounded as he left a deli in his home town of Chappaqua, New York. Hengjun Chao, a former Mount Sinai medical researcher who had been fired by Charney for research misconduct in 2010, was convicted of attempted second degree murder and two other charges in 2017, and received a sentence of 28 years.

In 2017, Dr. David H. Newman, a former emergency room physician at Mount Sinai Hospital, was sentenced to two years in prison for sexually abusing four female patients in the emergency room between 2015 and 2016, including touching their breasts.

Three doctors were convicted of violating anti-kickback laws by accepting bribes disguised as speaker fees to write prescriptions to a highly addictive fentanyl opioid painkiller. Gordon Freedman, an anesthesiologist at Mount Sinai, was convicted in December 2019 in Manhattan federal court. Alexandru Burducea, a pain management doctor and anesthesiologist who previously worked at Mount Sinai, was sentenced in January 2020 to 57 months in prison. Dialecti Voudouris, who specialized in oncology and hematology at Lenox Hill Hospital and Mount Sinai, was sentenced in 2020 to time served.

In April 2019, a lawsuit was filed against Mount Sinai Health System and several employees of the hospital and the Icahn School's Arnhold Institute for Global Health. The suit was filed by eight current and former doctors and employees for alleged age and sex discrimination and based on a list of other allegations. The school denied the claims.

Dr. David Reich, president and COO of the hospital, announced in March 2020 that the hospital was converting its lobbies into extra patient rooms to "meet the growing volume of patients" with coronavirus.

Mount Sinai Kravis Children's Hospital 

Mount Sinai Kravis Children's Hospital (KCH) at Mount Sinai is a nationally ranked pediatric acute care children's hospital located at the Mount Sinai campus in Manhattan, New York City, New York. The hospital has 102 pediatric beds. It is affiliated with The Icahn School of Medicine at Mount Sinai, and is a member of the Mount Sinai Health System. The hospital provides comprehensive pediatric specialties and subspecialties to infants, children, teens, and young adults aged 0–21 throughout the region.

Employment
, the entire Mount Sinai Health System had over 7,400 physicians, 2,000 residents and clinical fellows, and 42,000 employees, as well as 3,815 beds and 152 operating rooms, and delivered over 16,000 babies a year.

Affiliates

Mount Sinai has a number of hospital affiliates in the New York metropolitan area, including Brooklyn Hospital Center and an additional campus, Mount Sinai Hospital of Queens. The hospital is also affiliated with the Icahn School of Medicine at Mount Sinai, which opened in September 1968. In 2013, Mount Sinai Hospital joined with Continuum Health Partners in the creation of the Mount Sinai Health System. The system encompasses the Icahn School of Medicine at Mount Sinai and seven hospital campuses in the New York metropolitan area, as well as a large, regional ambulatory footprint.

Rankings

In 2019–20, Mount Sinai Hospital was recognized on the U.S. News & World Report "Best Hospitals Honor Roll," ranking 14th among the nearly 5,000 hospitals in the US, with 9 nationally ranked adult specialties including cardiology & heart surgery (#6), diabetes & endocrinology (#7), ear, nose, & throat (#28), gastroenterology & GI surgery (#9), geriatrics (#3), gynecology (#18), nephrology (#11), neurology & neurosurgery (#14), and orthopedics (#18) as well as 4 high-performing adult specialties including cancer, pulmonology & lung surgery, rehabilitation, and urology. Regionally, it was ranked the #3 hospital in New York.

Notable individuals

Benefactors
 Leon Black donated $10 million in 2005 to create the Black Family Stem Cell Institute.
 Emily and Len Blavatnik made a $10 million gift in 2018 to establish The Blavatnik Family Women's Health Research Institute at the Icahn School of Medicine at Mount Sinai and The Blavatnik Family – Chelsea Medical Center at Mount Sinai.
 Carl Icahn donated $25 million to Mount Sinai Medical Center for advanced medical research in 2004; a large building primarily devoted to research was renamed from the "East Building" to the "Icahn Medical Institute." In 2012, Icahn pledged $200 million to the institution. In exchange, the medical school was renamed the Icahn School of Medicine at Mount Sinai and the genomics institute led by Eric Schadt was renamed the Icahn Institute for Genomics and Multiscale Biology.
 Frederick Klingenstein, former CEO of Wertheim & Co., and wife Sharon Klingenstein donated $75 million in 1999 to the medical school, the largest single gift in the history of Mount Sinai medical school at the time, to establish an institute for scientific research and create a scholarship fund.
 Henry Kravis and wife Marie-Josée Kravis donated $15 million to establish the "Center for Cardiovascular Health" as well as funding a professorship.
 Samuel A. Lewis, NYC political leader and philanthropist who served for 21 years (1852–1873) as the first director, then honorary secretary, and finally chairman of the executive committee.
 Hermann Merkin gave $2 million in dedication of the kosher kitchen at the hospital.
 Derald Ruttenberg donated $7 million in 1986 to establish the Ruttenberg Cancer Center at Mount Sinai and later contributed $8 million more.
 Martha Stewart donated $5 million in 2007 to start the Martha Stewart Center for Living at Mount Sinai Hospital. The center promotes access to medical care and offers support to caregivers needing referrals or education.
 James Tisch and wife Merryl Tisch donated $40 million in 2008 to establish The Tisch Cancer Institute, a state-of-the-art, patient-oriented comprehensive cancer care and research facility.

Staff

 Jacob M. Appel (born 1973), bioethicist and liberal commentator
 Mark Blumenthal (1831–1921), resident and attending physician of Mount Sinai Hospital from 1854 to 1859 
 Burrill Bernard Crohn (1884–1983), gastroenterologist and one of the first to describe the disease of which he is the namesake, Crohn's disease.
 Sander S. Florman, director of Recanati/Miller Transplant Institute.
 Valentín Fuster (born 1943), director of Mount Sinai Heart, The Zena and Michael A. Wiener Cardiovascular Institute, The Marie-Josée and Henry R. Kravis Center for Cardiovascular Health, The Richard Gorlin, MD/Heart Research Foundation Professor, Icahn School of Medicine at Mount Sinai
 Eric M. Genden, Isidore Friesner Professor and Chair of Otolaryngology - Head and Neck Surgery, Senior Associate Dean for Clinical Affairs, and Professor of Neurosurgery and Immunology at the Icahn School of Medicine at Mount Sinai. He is Chair of Otolaryngology - Head and Neck Surgery, Executive Vice President of Ambulatory Surgery, and Director of the Head and Neck Institute at the Mount Sinai Health System. 
Named one of the most innovative surgeons alive today, in 2006 he became the first surgeon ever to perform a successful jaw transplant. 
 Irving B. Goldman (1898–1975), first president of the American Academy of Facial Plastic and Reconstructive Surgery, 1964
 Jonathan L. Halperin (born 1949), director of Clinical Cardiology in the Zena and Michael A. Wierner Cardiovascular Institute
 Michael Heidelberger (1888–1991), immunologist regarded as the father of modern immunology
 Abraham Jacobi (1830–1919), pediatrician and president of the American Medical Association. Pioneer of pediatrics In the US, devoted to women's and children's welfare.
 I. Michael Leitman (born 1959), American surgeon and medical educator
 Blair Lewis (born 1956), gastroenterologist who helped develop the American Gastroenterological Association's position statement on occult and obscure gastrointestinal bleeding
 Helen S. Mayberg (born 1956), founding director of the Center for Advanced Circuit Therapeutics
 John Puskas, performed the first totally thoracoscopic bilateral pulmonary vein isolation procedure
 David L. Reich, academic anesthesiologist, president and chief operating officer of Mount Sinai, chair of the department of anesthesiology, Horace W. Goldsmith Professor of Anesthesiology.
 Isidor Clinton Rubin (1883–1958), gynecologist and infertility specialist
 Jonas Salk (1914–1995), inventor of the polio vaccine, worked as a staff physician at Mount Sinai after medical school
 Milton Sapirstein (1914–1996), clinical psychiatrist. Sought "to mesh the advances being made in neurobiology in the 1940s with psychoanalytic concepts."
 Samin Sharma (born 1955), interventional cardiologist,  co-founder of the Eternal Heart Care Centre and Research Institute, Jaipur, and director, Dr. Samin K. Sharma Family Foundation Cardiac Catheterization Laboratory
 Larry J. Siever (1947-2021), psychiatrist known for his work in studying personality disorders.

See also
 Cedars-Sinai Medical Center

References

Further reading
 The Sinai Nurse: A History of Nursing at the Mount Sinai Hospital, 1852–2000 by Marjorie Gulla Lewis and Sylvia M. Barker
 The Social Work-Medicine Relationship: 100 Years at Mount Sinai by Helen Rehr

External links

 
 Guide to the Mount Sinai Hospital (New York, N.Y.) Records 1851–1994 at the American Jewish Historical Society

East Harlem
Hospitals established in 1852
Hospital buildings completed in 1855
Hospital buildings completed in 1904
Hospitals in Manhattan
Jews and Judaism in Manhattan
Teaching hospitals in New York City
Fifth Avenue
Upper East Side
Jewish medical organizations
1852 establishments in New York (state)